Paper Wheat is a play by the 25th Street House Theatre about the hard lives of early Saskatchewan settlers and the foundation of the wheat pools and the Co-op movement on the Canadian Prairies. The most successful stage show in Saskatchewan history, Paper Wheat opened in Sintaluta, Saskatchewan on May 18, 1977 and subsequently played to full houses across the province and nation.

Paper Wheat was an example of documentary theatre, with company members traveling to local communities to collect stories about Saskatchewan history. It was collectively created and written by its originating cast and crew, including director Andras Tahn and actors Linda Griffiths and Lubomir Mykytiuk. Later productions, under the direction of Guy Sprung, added further new characters and dialogue created by the same collective process.

Film
A Prairie tour of the play was filmed by National Film Board of Canada filmmaker Albert Kish (in 1979), as one of the last films in its Challenge for Change series.

References

External links
Watch Paper Wheat at NFB.ca

Canadian plays
1979 films
Canadian drama films
Canadian plays adapted into films
National Film Board of Canada films
Culture of Saskatchewan
Films set in Saskatchewan
Docudrama plays
Plays set in the 18th century
Plays set in Canada
1977 plays
1970s Canadian films